The Czechs are an ethnic minority in Romania, numbering 3,938 people according to the 2002 census. The majority of Romanian Czechs live in the south-west of the country, with around 60% of them living in Caraș-Severin County, where they make up 0.7% of the population.

As an officially recognised ethnic minority, Czechs, together with Slovaks, have one seat reserved in the Romanian Chamber of Deputies associated within Democratic Union of Slovaks and Czechs of Romania.

History 
The Czechs were among the last peoples colonized by the Habsburg Empire in Banat. Their colonization took place in three main waves/stages: 1823, 1827 and 1862, as a consequence of the need to populate the sparsely populated territories, to clear the forests and to ensure, together with the inhabitants of the Romanian villages, the protection of the borders.

Communes with the largest Czech population percentage
 Dubova, Mehedinți—40.70%
 Gârnic, Caraș-Severin—33.46%
 Coronini, Caraș-Severin—27.36%
 Berzasca, Caraș-Severin—14.24%
 Șopotu Nou, Caraș-Severin—10.92%
 Lăpușnicel, Caraș-Severin—10.75%
 Socol, Caraș-Severin—4.60%
 Peregu Mare, Arad—3.83%
 Eșelnița, Mehedinți—2.31%
 Orșova, Mehedinți—1.85%

There are six villages with a Czech majority. Five are in Caraș-Severin County: Bigăr, Berzasca Commune; Gârnic, Gârnic Commune; Ravensca, Șopotu Nou Commune; Sfânta Elena, Coronini Commune; and Șumița, Lăpușnicel Commune. One is in Mehedinți County: Eibenthal, Dubova Commune.

Notable Czech-Romanians

 Ignat Bednarik, painter
 Anton Chladek, painter
 Matilda Cugler-Poni, poet
 Ludovic Dauș, novelist
 Julius Podlipny, painter
 Jan Tausinger, violinist, conductor and composer
 Anton Vorel, herbalist
 Lascăr Vorel, painter

Notes

See also 
 Slovak people in Romania

Romania

Banat
Ethnic groups in Romania